Steven Nyamuzinga (born 30 November 1986) is a Zimbabwean first-class cricketer who plays for Mountaineers cricket team.

References

External links
 

1986 births
Living people
Zimbabwean cricketers
Mountaineers cricketers
Sportspeople from Marondera